Methamidophos, trade name "Monitor," is an organophosphate insecticide.

Crops grown with the use of methamidophos include potatoes and some Latin American rice. Many nations have used methamidophos on crops, including developed nations such as Spain, United States, Japan, and Australia. Due to its toxicity, the use of pesticides that contain methamidophos is currently being phased out in Brazil. In 2009, all uses in the United States were voluntarily canceled.

Toxicity
 rates of 21 and 16 mg/kg for male and female rats, respectively.  10–30 mg/kg in rabbits, and dermal LD50 of 50 mg/kg in rats.  It is rapidly absorbed through the stomach, lungs, and skin in humans, and eliminated primarily through urine.  It is a cholinesterase inhibitor.

Breakdown in soil is 6.1 days in sand, 309 days in water at pH 5.0, 27 days at pH 7.0, and 3 days at pH 9.0.  Sunlight accelerates breakdown.  It is uptaken through roots and leaves of plants.
 
It is classified as a WHO Toxicity Class "Class 1b, Highly Hazardous", and its parent chemical, acephate, is "class III, Slightly Hazardous".

Use
Methamidophos is used in great quantities in ricefields in China.  Rice–fish culture is common in the southern parts of China as well as in many other rice-producing countries (e.g., Thailand, Malaysia, and the Philippines).  Brown rice (unpolished) in this study contained double the concentration of polished rice.  Both plants and animals did not degrade the pesticide well, and fish for human consumption in these cases contains methamidophos in concentrations roughly similar to brown rice.

Use in poisoning
Methamidophos was found in dumplings (gyoza) manufactured in China for the Japanese market after a number of consumers became sick.

References

External links 
 

Acetylcholinesterase inhibitors
Organophosphate insecticides
Phosphoramidothioates
Methoxy compounds